"Grilled" is the second episode of the second season of the American television drama series Breaking Bad. It was written by George Mastras and directed by Charles Haid.

This episode marks the first appearance of Mark Margolis as Hector Salamanca, and the final appearance of Raymond Cruz as Tuco Salamanca in Breaking Bad.

Plot 

Having been kidnapped by a crazed Tuco Salamanca, Walter White and Jesse Pinkman are held prisoner in a desert hideout where he takes care of his sick uncle, the mute Hector Salamanca. Hector is incapacitated from the neck down and unable to speak, but he can communicate with a desk bell attached to his wheelchair. Tuco explains that Hank Schrader and the DEA have rounded up Tuco's entire organization. Unaware of Gonzo's death, Tuco believes that Gonzo has ratted him out. He intends to keep Walt and Jesse in the compound until his cousins arrive at sunset to take them all across the border to Mexico, where they will cook meth for Tuco 24/7.

Hank, meanwhile, takes a bit of time off to look for Walt. Skyler White is sick with worry and has been distributing handbills with Walt's photo. Marie Schrader, who believes Jesse is Walt's marijuana dealer, pleads Hank to question Jesse. Unable to find him, Hank talks to Jesse's mother Diane Pinkman. Mrs. Pinkman supplies Hank with information letting him follow the LoJack tracking system in Jesse's car.

At the hideout, Walt poisons Tuco's food with the ricin he has prepared, but Hector sees him and knocks the plate off the table. Tuco realizes Walt and Jesse are plotting something and takes them outside, holding a gun to Jesse's head and forcing Walt to confess to the poisoning. With Tuco distracted, Jesse overpowers him and wounds him with his pistol. When they see a vehicle approaching in the distance, Walt and Jesse quickly crawl into hiding. Hank arrives at the hideout and gets into a shootout with the wounded Tuco, whom he kills in self-defense. Hank begins to investigate the scene as Walt and Jesse silently escape.

Production 
"Grilled" was written by George Mastras and directed by Charles Haid. It aired on AMC in the United States and Canada on March 15, 2009.

Reception 
"Grilled" was very well received. Seth Amitin, of IGN, criticized the episode for prolonging Walt and Jesse's entrance into the drug trade. He gave the episode an 8.9/10.

In 2019 The Ringer ranked "Grilled" as the 25th best out of the 62 total Breaking Bad episodes.

References

External links 
"Grilled" at the official Breaking Bad site

2009 American television episodes
Breaking Bad (season 2) episodes